Crane Creek is a stream in the U.S. state of Minnesota. It is a tributary of the Straight River.

Crane Creek was named for the cranes which once frequented this waterway.

See also
List of rivers of Minnesota

References

Rivers of Steele County, Minnesota
Rivers of Waseca County, Minnesota
Rivers of Minnesota